The 100th Regiment of Foot, also known as Campbell's Highlanders, was an infantry regiment of the British Army, formed in 1760 and disbanded in 1763.

The regiment was raised in 1760 by the regimentation of independent companies of infantry, and embodied at Stirling in 1761. It was at first sent for garrison duty in the Channel Islands before being sent to the Caribbean. In 1762, they saw service at the Invasion of Martinique from France. With the end of the Seven Years' War in 1763, the regiment was disbanded in Scotland.

The unofficial title Campbell's Highlanders was adopted from its first Major-Commandant, Colin Campbell; a similar title was used, at the same time, by the 88th Foot.

Colonels
The colonels of the regiment were:
5 April 1761 –  Maj. Colin Campbell
1762 – Maj. John Broughton [to 1763]

References

Sources

Infantry regiments of the British Army
Military units and formations established in 1760
Military units and formations disestablished in 1763